Garrett Standish Barry   (1788 – 26 December 1864) was a Liberal Member of Parliament for Cork County in the Parliament of the United Kingdom from 1832 to 1841. An extremely popular figure, Standish Barry retired to give his seat to "The Emancipator" Daniel O'Connell, who had failed to retain his seat in Dublin.
 
The eldest son of Standish Barry and Margaret Roche, he was from a prominent landed family seated at Leamlara House, Carrigtwohill. He was the first Catholic MP elected to represent Cork since the Roman Catholic Act of Emancipation in 1829. He was educated at Trinity College, Dublin and called to the Irish bar in 1811. After Standish Barry died, The Cork Examiner wrote of him, "In public life he was respected a stanch and uncompromising Liberal. In private he was esteemed for his highly honourable character and the amiability and kindness of his disposition."

References

1788 births
1864 deaths
Alumni of Trinity College Dublin
Members of the Parliament of the United Kingdom for County Cork constituencies (1801–1922)
UK MPs 1832–1835
Irish Repeal Association MPs
Irish barristers
Politicians from County Cork